Mohammadpur Union is a union parishad situated at Mohammadpur Upazila,  in Magura District, Khulna Division of Bangladesh. There are 25 villages and 24 mouzas in the union.

References

External links
 

Unions of Mohammadpur Upazila